Notre Dame de la Motte is a chapel located at the top of the hill de la Motte, in Vesoul (France).

Churches completed in 1857
Chapels in France
Churches in Haute-Saône
Vesoul
1857 establishments in France